Patife Band is the first official release from the homonymous Brazilian post-punk/experimental rock band Patife Band, released in 1985 by now-defunct independent label Lira Paulistana Records. The song selection includes four original compositions by Patife Band, as well as punk rock-inflected covers of Bobby di Carlo's "Tijolinho" and of the Portuguese-language anonymous adaptation of the traditional Christmas song "Silent Night".

"Pregador Maldito" would appear on the soundtrack of the 1986 Brazilian film Cidade Oculta, directed by Chico Botelho and starring Paulo Barnabé's older brother, Arrigo, who also compiled and provided some tracks for the OST. The tracks "Pregador Maldito", "Pesadelo" and "Tô Tenso" would be re-recorded for their debut Corredor Polonês.

Track listing

Personnel
 Patife Band
 Paulo Barnabé – vocals, production, mixing
 André Fonseca – guitars, production, mixing
 Cidão Trindade – drums
 Sidney Giovenazzi – bass
 Nicolino Bloise, Eduardo Santos – production, mixing
 Renata Silva – cover art
 Sílvia Avanzi, Idafoggia – production

External links
 Patife Band at Discogs

1985 debut EPs
Patife Band albums
Portuguese-language EPs